The Ipswich Market Act 2004 (c.iii) is a local Act of the Parliament of the United Kingdom allowing a market in Ipswich to take place on Butter Market, Cornhill, King Street, Lion Street, Lloyds Avenue, Princes Street, Queen Street, Thoroughfare and Westgate Street.

External links

United Kingdom Acts of Parliament 2004
History of Ipswich
Acts of the Parliament of the United Kingdom concerning England
2004 in England
2000s in Suffolk